Íþróttabandalag Vestmannaeyja is an Icelandic football club that was founded in 1903. Based in Vestmannaeyjar, the team first qualified for a European competition when they finished in fifth place in 1968 to enter the 1969–70 European Cup Winners' Cup first round, where they were eliminated by Bulgarian side Levski-Spartak by 0–8 on aggregate. After coming second in 1971, ÍBV secured a place in the 1972–73 UEFA Cup. Their first European Cup participation was confirmed in 1979, after being crowned as winners, thus being allowed into the 1980–81 season of that contest. The Icelandic outfit achieved their best performance in the 1978–79 UEFA Cup of the second tie, where they were defeated by Poland's Śląsk Wrocław with a cumulative score of 1–4.

ÍBV's highest victory was against Hibernians of Malta in the 1997–98 UEFA Cup Winners' Cup qualifying stage, a 3–0 win at their home turf, Hásteinsvöllur. The biggest loss came against Borussia Mönchengladbach, in the 1973–74 European Cup Winners' Cup beginning phase, which was a 1–9 deficit at Bökelbergstadion. The side's most recent meeting was against Serbians Red Star Belgrade in the 2013–14 UEFA Europa League, recording a 0–2 comprehensive rout, following a 0–0 home draw and 0–2 away blow.

Matches

Overall record

By competition

By country

Notes

References

External links
 
Íþróttabandalag Vestmannaeyja's European results (1969–2002) 
Íþróttabandalag Vestmannaeyja at UEFA.com

Íþróttabandalag Vestmannaeyja